Anthonia Edwards is an English singer and nurse from Blackheath. She won the eleventh series of The Voice UK.

Career
In 2022, Anthonia auditioned for the eleventh series of The Voice UK, and joined Tom Jones' team. After covering Justin Bieber's Anyone, she was announced as the winner of the series.

Discography

Singles

References

Living people
The Voice (franchise) winners
The Voice UK contestants
Year of birth missing (living people)